Yangibozor is an urban-type settlement and seat of Peshku District in Bukhara Region in Uzbekistan. It was established on 15 April 1950. Its population was 4,426 in 1989, and 7,100 in 2016. Center of Yangi Bozor is situated in street Chiqirchi. There are two colleges Vocational and Industrial colleges.

References

Populated places in Bukhara Region
Urban-type settlements in Uzbekistan